INS Vinash (K85) (Destruction) was a  of the 25th Killer Missile Boat Squadron of the Indian Navy.

Operation Python
The strike force approached Karachi on 8 December 1971 in rough seas.

Vinash fired 4 SS-N-2B Styx missiles at various targets. The first missile struck the fuel tanks at Keamari Oil Farm. Another missile hit and sunk Panamian fuel tanker SS Gulf Star.

Operation Python and its preceding Operation Trident were successful. The Pakistani fuel reserves for the Karachi sector were destroyed and flames could be seen from 60 miles away. India established complete control over the oil route from the Persian Gulf to Pakistani ports. Shipping traffic to and from Karachi, Pakistan's only major port at that time, ceased.

Lt. Cdr. Vijai Jerath, commanding officer of INS Vinash was awarded the Vir Chakra for the operation.

References

Vidyut-class missile boats
Fast attack craft of the Indian Navy